Dance the Night Away may refer to:

 "Dance the Night Away" (The Mavericks song)
 "Dance the Night Away" (Van Halen song)
 "Dance the Night Away", a song by Cream from the album Disraeli Gears
 "Dance the Night Away", a song by Europe from the album Wings of Tomorrow
 "Dance the Night Away", a 2018 song by South Korean girl group Twice